Topsentia is a genus of sponges belonging to the family Halichondriidae.

The genus has cosmopolitan distribution.

Species

Species:

Topsentia amorpha 
Topsentia aqabaensis 
Topsentia arcotti

References

Sponges